Caroline Conroy is an Irish Green Party politician who has served as Lord Mayor of Dublin since June 2022.

In June 2022, she was elected as the 354th Lord Mayor of Dublin, succeeding Alison Gilliland. She was elected to Dublin City Council for the Ballymun-Finglas local electoral area in 2019. She also serves on the executive committee of the Green Party.

References

External links
Green Party profile

Living people
Green Party (Ireland) politicians
Lord Mayors of Dublin
Alumni of Dublin City University
1977 births